Crying Nut is a punk band from South Korea. They are often credited as being pioneers of the Korean punk and indie rock scenes.

The group began performing in 1995 in the Hongdae club scene in Seoul. They released their debut album, Speed Up Losers, in 1998, selling over 100,000 copies. Crying Nut became a household name in South Korea following their performances at the 2002 FIFA World Cup. The group has released eight full-length albums as of 2018.

Joseon Punk
In the 1990s, the Korean public was being exposed to many foreign musical styles for the first time, following new political freedom. The early punk bands including Crying Nut incorporated foreign genres in new and unusual ways, while still reflecting their inherent Koreanness. They branded themselves Chosun Punk (now romanized as Joseon Punk) in light of this duality. This tight-knit movement is credited with birthing independent music in Korea.

Overseas tours
Crying Nut has extensively toured outside of Korea, having been to Japan numerous times, as well as China, Germany, Singapore, the US, the UK, and Sweden. They played the Fuji Rock Festival in 2000, Trastock Festival in Sweden, and Singapore's Mosaic Music Festival in 2008. Following up on their fame from the 2002 World Cup, they performed at the welcoming ceremony of the 2006 FIFA World Cup in Germany. Their first concert in America was at the Seattle Korean Festival in 2006, and their first concert in the UK was the London Korean Festival in 2006.

They performed at SXSW in 2012 and toured North America as part of the Seoulsonic 2K12 tour funded by KOCCA alongside 3rd Line Butterfly and Yellow Monsters. Reportedly the police came to their SXSW gig due to concerns the venue might collapse because of the audience jumping. They also played at the Canadian Music Week for a special music showcase sponsored by Korea's Ministry of Culture, Sports and Tourism.

They returned to SXSW in 2014 with an unprecedented 13 other Korean bands, ranging from Jay Park and Hyuna to fellow punk band No Brain. An image of member Kim Insoo playing accordion was published on the Grammy website.

Legal dispute
Crying Nut sued CNBLUE and its agency FNC Entertainment for unauthorized use of their song “Deathblow Offside” on Mnet's “M Countdown” in 2010. Crying Nut also charged that CNBLUE had released a DVD of the concert in Japan and profited from it. Crying Nut claimed that not only did CNBLUE use the song without permission, but also lip-synced along with the original Crying Nut recording. Crying Nut allegedly posted online that CNBLUE "must pay the penalties for intellectual property rights infringement". CNBLUE later countersued Crying Nut for allegedly accusing CNBLUE of copyright infringement, filing an injunction against Crying Nut's online criticisms, claiming that the intellectual property theft was the responsibility of CJ E&M and the unspecified company responsible for the DVD sales, and that Crying Nut's allegations may have permanently damaged CNBLUE's reputation as Hallyu stars. But the Court rejected CNBLUE's assertion.

Band members
 Park Yoon-Sik (박윤식): Vocals, Guitar
Lee Sang-Myun (이상면): Guitar
Lee Sang-Hyuk (이상혁): Drums
Han Kyung-Rock (한경록) also known as captain rock(캡틴락): Bass
Kim In-Soo (김인수): Accordion, keyboard
Lee Sang-Myun and Lee Sang-Hyuk are twins.

Discography

Albums
[1998-06-01] Speed Up Losers (KM Culture)|말달리자
[1999-11-05] Circus Magic Clowns (KM Culture)|서커스 매직 유랑단
[2001-06-01] Poor Hand Love Song (KM Culture)|하수연가
[2002-12-05] The Secondhand Radio (KM Culture)|고물라디오
[2006-07-14] Milk Cattle at the OK Corral (Blue Cord)|OK 목장의 젖소
[2009-08-10] Uncomfortable Party(Drug/LOEN)|불편한 파티 
[2013-06-07] Flaming Nuts (Drug/LOEN) FLAMING NUTS
[2018-10-12] Remodeling (Mirrorball Music) 리모델링

Split albums
[1996-12-01] Our Nation 1 (Crying Nut / Yellow Kitchen)

Singles
[2005-11-02] The Hero 
[2007-01-12] Hello Whale (안녕 고래)
[2007-02-13] Vodka Seoul Driving (보드카 서울 드라이빙)
[2007-02-13] Isn't That Good (좋지아니한가)
[2015-7-16] Bye-Bye (안녕)

Live albums
[2003-06-05] Crying Nut Best Wild Wild Live
[2003-??-??] Wild Wild Live (DVD)
[2010-??-??] Diary of Drifting 15 years -15th Anniversary Live Concert DVD

EPs
[2014-09-15] 96-Crying Nut x Nobrain (with No Brain)
[2014-06-02] Victory Korea Again (다시 한번 필승 코리아)
[2011-10-18] Naughty Boy (Crying Nut & Galaxy Express ) (개구쟁이)
[2009-04-16] Nexen Heroes (넥센 히어로즈)
[2006-05-11] The HERO

OST
[2007-04-02] KBS Drama 'Hello! Miss baby'(헬로! 애기씨) OST (#1. Funky Dance)
[2007-02-13] Movie 'Isn't That Good' OST single (Isn't That Good) (좋지아니한가)
[2007-07-10] MBC Sitcom. 'Rainbow Romance' OST (#1. Over The Rainbow)
[2002-??-??] Movie 'Who are you' OST (#7. Oh! What a Shiny Night) (#7. 밤이 깊었네)
[2001-05-24] Movie 'a moonlit night of Shinla' OST (#10. Vicious Song) (#10. 지독한 노래)
[2000-10-28] Movie 'Just Do It' OST (#1.Do the right thing, #3. Sorry) (#1.똑바로 살아라, #3. 미안해)

Compilation & Omnibus Albums
[2015-04-22] Indie 20 (Korean Indie 20th Anniversary Album Part.4) (#2. Six Pack)
[2011-08-02] Reborn Sanulrim(산울림; echo) Tribute (#14. So Soon) (#14. 아니 벌써)
[2010-03-08] The Shouts Of Reds. United Korea (#7. Wake Up Korea) (#7. 일어나라 대한민국)
[2008-08-24] Sex Pistols Tribute - No Puture for You (#2. My Way)
[2006-05-08] I LOVE FOOTBALL - The World Famous FootBall Song Collection (#4. Deathblow Offside) (#4. 필살 오프사이드)
[2005-08-15] Korean Independence 60th anniversary Album (#2. Song for an army of national independence) (#2. 독립군가)
[2002-07-??] The Red Devil official cheer song Album "꿈★은 이루어진다" (#3. Fighting Korea) (#3. 오! 필승코리아)
[2001-02-13] Deul-gook-Hwa(들국화; wild chrysanthemum) Trubute (#3. a train to the global) (#3. 세계로 가는 기차)
[2001-??-??] Hee-RO-A-Ruk (희로애락; delight anger sorrow enjoyment) (#3. Poppy) (#3. 양귀비)
[1999-04-24] Cho-Sun Punk (#2. A Fistful of Dollars, #10. All Die, #18. Flaming sun with passion And Hot body ) (#2.황야의 무법자, #10. 다죽자, #18. 정렬에 불타는 태양과 핫바디)
[1999-05-??] Open The Door (#12. Vladimir, a guy gone to Gwangju ) (#12. 블라드미르 광주로 간 사나이)
[1997-09-23] NIRVANA Tribute - Smells Like Nirvana (#2. Everything and Nothing)

Video Games
Their songs Circus Magic and Astral songs are featured in the arcade game Pump It Up.
Remastered versions of "Speed Up Losers" and "Oh! What a Shiny Night" have also appeared in Audition Online in promotion of the Guitar Mode game feature in late 2010.

Accomplishments & Awards 
1998 MNET Music Video Festival (Indie Music Video of the Year) 
1999 KMTV Korean Music Awards (Indie Artist of the Year)
1999 MNET Music Video Festival (Indie Music Video of the Year)
2000 MTV Asia Music Awards (Korean Artist of the Year—Nominee)
2000 MNET Music Video Festival (Indie Music Video of the Year)
2001 Mnet Asian Music Awards (Best Indie Performance for "Deep in the Night")
2007 한국대중음악상 Korean Music Awards (Musician of the Year - Nominee)
2007 한국대중음악상 Korean Music Awards (Best Rock Album of the Year - Nominee)
2007 한국대중음악상 Korean Music Awards (Best Rock Song of the Year - Nominee)
2010 국내 2000년대 베스트 앨범 100beat.com Top 100 Korean Albums of the Decade (#54 ‘하수연가 Poor Hand Love Song’)

References

External links

South Korean punk rock groups
South Korean indie rock groups
South Korean rock music groups
Musical groups established in 1995
MAMA Award winners